The Engineering functional constituency is a functional constituency in the elections for the Legislative Council of Hong Kong first created in 1991, derived from the Engineering, Architectural, Surveying and Planning functional constituency. The constituency is composed of professional engineers and the members of the Hong Kong Institution of Engineers. As of 2021, it was composed of 10,772 registered voters.

Return members

Electoral results

2020s

2010s

2000s

1990s

References

Constituencies of Hong Kong
Constituencies of Hong Kong Legislative Council
Functional constituencies (Hong Kong)
1991 establishments in Hong Kong
Constituencies established in 1991